Famous in 12 is an American reality television-social experiment series that aired on The CW. Premiering on June 3, 2014, the series chronicles the Artiaga family as they relocate to Los Angeles in order to seek fame over the course of 12 weeks. TMZ and Harvey Levin provide the family with opportunities and situations to increase their chances. While on the series, the family continues to build their brand utilizing social media to interact with viewers. Each week features a "star power meter" that calculates which individual family member is receiving the most interest. The show was canceled in week five and the family was sent home early due to lack of viewer interest.

Cast
 Mike Artiaga
 Angie Artiaga
 Jameelah Artiaga
 Maariyah Artiaga
 Taliah Artiaga

Episodes

References

External links
 

2010s American reality television series
2014 American television series debuts
2014 American television series endings
English-language television shows
Television shows set in Los Angeles
The CW original programming
Television series by Warner Horizon Television